The Langvann Hydroelectric Power Station ( or Langvann kraftstasjon) is a hydroelectric power station in the municipality of Gildeskål in Nordland county, Norway. It is sometimes referred to as the Langvatn kraftverk, which should not be confused with the Langvatn Hydroelectric Power Station in Rana.

The plant has a 5 MW turbine and an average annual production of about 21 GWh. The plant is owned by Salten Kraftsamband and it came into operation in 1979. The plant is built into the mountainside at the end of a drain tunnel and the water it discharges is later used by the Sundsfjord Hydroelectric Power Station.

See also

References

Hydroelectric power stations in Norway
Gildeskål
Energy infrastructure completed in 1979
1979 establishments in Norway